Ramesh Datla is an Indian Industrialist and Chairman of Elico Limited the first Analytical Instruments company in India established in 1960. He is also the Chairman of Elico Healthcare Services Ltd a leading player in the Healthcare IT & ITES Space. He is an active member of Confederation of Indian Industry (CII) and is the Chairman, CII National Committee on IPR, Immediate Past Chairman, CII National Committee on Water and Past Chairman, CII Southern Region and Past Chairperson, CII National Committee on Intellectual Property rights. He was also the past Chairman, CII National MSME Council. He has been actively associated with the industry chamber and held several advisory beneficial roles to the Government of India on behalf of the Industry. He represented India as a speaker in the OECD Conference - Tokyo, GTZ Conference - Berlin, Gulf Cooperation Council Meeting - Muscat, UKIBC Conference - Manchester, USIBC Conference - Washington DC and B20 Working Group for G20 Summit, France. He also led several delegations to United States, Europe, Mexico, Japan, South East Asia, China, Africa & CIS countries.

Early life and education 
Born on 25 October 1961. Ramesh Datla holds a Doctorate in Instrumentation from SK University, Graduate in Executive Management from MIT Sloan School of Management, Post Graduate Diploma in Electronics Design Technology from Indian Institute of Science, a Master’s in Electrical Engineering from Wichita State University.

Career 
Ramesh started his career at Cirrus Logic Inc, a semiconductor company located in Milpitas, California, USA before moving to India. Later he joined ELICO Limited and held several positions before taking over as Managing Director.

Associations 
 Member B20 Working Group as part of G20 Heads of State & Governments Summit 2012, Mexico.
 Member B20 Working Group as part of G20 Heads of State & Governments Summit 2011, France.
 Chairman, Confederation of Indian Industry (CII) – National MSME Council.
 Member, National Board for MSME, Ministry of MSME, Govt. of India.
 Member, National Instrumentation Development Board (NIDB), Department of Science and Technology (DST), Govt. of India.
 Board of Director, State Bank of Hyderabad.
 Member, Advisory Board, Electronics & ICT Academy NIT Warangal
 Member, Governing Board, Jawaharlal Nehru Technological University, Hyderabad and Kakinada & Osmania University.

He also actively participated with following associations in past.
 Chairman, Bharatiya Yuva Shakti Trust (BYST) - Andhra Pradesh, Hyderabad. 
 Chairman, Confederation of Indian Industry (CII) - Southern Region 
 Chairman, Confederation of Indian Industry (CII) – National IPR Committee, New Delhi
 Chairman, Confederation of Indian Industry (CII) – National Membership Committee, New Delhi
 Chairman, Confederation of Indian Industry (CII) – National MSME Council, New Delhi
 Chairman, Confederation of Indian Industry (CII) – Andhra Pradesh State Council.  
 Chairman, Employers" Federation of Southern India (EFSI) - AP, Hyderabad
 Chairman, Indo-American Chamber of Commerce (IACC-AP).
 President, ISA-The Instrumentation, Systems, and Automation Society, Hyderabad Section
 President, Electronic Industries Association of A.P.

References

External links 
 ELICO
 Elico Healthcare Services

Living people
MIT Sloan School of Management alumni
Indian Institute of Science alumni
Wichita State University alumni
1961 births
Telugu people